This topic covers notable events and articles related to 2010 in music.

Specific locations
2010 in American music
2010 in Asian music
2010 in Australian music
2010 in British music
2010 in Canadian music
2010 in European music (Continental Europe)
2010 in Irish music
2010 in Japanese music
2010 in New Zealand music
2010 in Norwegian music
2010 in Philippine music
2010 in Swedish music
2010 in South Korean music

Specific genres 
2010 in alternative rock
2010 in classical music
2010 in country music
2010 in heavy metal music
2010 in hip hop music
2010 in Latin music
2010 in jazz
2010 in opera

Albums released 
List of 2010 albums

Deaths

January
 10 – Dick Johnson (84), American big band clarinetist
 13 
 Teddy Pendergrass (59), American R&B singer
 Jay Reatard (29), American indie rock singer
 18 – Kate McGarrigle (63), Canadian folk singer (Kate & Anna McGarrigle)
 26 – Dag Frøland (64), Norwegian comedian, singer and variety artist

February
 6 – John Dankworth (82), English jazz saxophonist, clarinetist and composer
 13 – Dale Hawkins (73), American rockabilly singer
 14 – Doug Fieger (54), American power pop singer and guitarist (The Knack)
 23 – Chilly B (47), American electro rapper (Newcleus)
 27 – Larry Cassidy (56), British post-punk singer and guitarist (Section 25)

March
 4 – Amalie Christie (96), Norwegian pianist
 6 – Mark Linkous (47), American alternative rock singer (Sparklehorse)
 7 – Tony Campise (67), American jazz saxophonist
 17 – Alex Chilton (59), American power pop singer (The Box Tops, Big Star)
 23 – Marva Wright (62), American blues and jazz singer
 28 – Herb Ellis (88), American jazz guitarist

April
 8 – Malcolm McLaren (64), British new wave musician and rock manager
 13 – Steve Reid (66), American jazz drummer
 14 – Peter Steele (48), American heavy metal singer (Type O Negative)
 18 – Devon Clifford (30), Canadian indie rock drummer (You Say Party)
 19 – Guru (43), American rapper (Gang Starr)
 21 – Gustav Lorentzen (62), Norwegian folk singer and entertainer in Knutsen & Ludvigsen (Cardiac arrest)
 29 – Johannes Fritsch (68), German composer and violist

May
 5 – Alfons Kontarsky (77), German pianist
 9 – Lena Horne (92), American jazz singer
 16 
 Ronnie James Dio (67), American heavy metal singer (Elf, Rainbow, Black Sabbath, Dio, Heaven & Hell)
 Hank Jones (91), American jazz pianist, bandleader, arranger, and composer
23 – Billy Francis (68), American rock keyboardist (Dr. Hook & the Medicine Show)
24 – Paul Gray (38), bassist for Slipknot
 30 – Kristian Bergheim (83), Norwegian jazz saxophonist

June
 5 – Arne Nordheim (78), Norwegian composer
 6 – Marvin Isley (56), American R&B bassist (The Isley Brothers)
 7 – Stuart Cable (40), British alternative rock drummer (Stereophonics)
 16 – Garry Shider (56), American funk guitarist (Parliament-Funkadelic)
 21 
 Larry Jon Wilson (69), American country singer
 Chris Sievey (54), British singer and comedian
 23 – Pete Quaife (68), British rock bassist (The Kinks)
 24 – Fred Anderson (81), American jazz tenor saxophonist

July
 10 – Sugar Minott (54), Jamaican reggae singer
 12 – Tuli Kupferberg (80), American psychedelic musician and poet (The Fugs)
 15 – Knut Stensholm (56), Norwegian drummer (Sambandet)
 19 – Andy Hummel (59), American power pop bassist (Big Star)
 23 – Willy Bakken (59), Norwegian guitarist and popular culture writer
 26 – Al Goodman (67), American R&B singer (Ray, Goodman & Brown)

August
 6 
 Catfish Collins (66), American funk guitarist (The J.B.'s, Parliament-Funkadelic)
 Chris Dedrick (63), American sunshine pop singer, guitarist and arranger (The Free Design)
 14 – Abbey Lincoln (80), American jazz singer
 19 – Michael Been (60), American alternative rock singer and bassist (The Call)

September
 3 – Mike Edwards (62), American rock cellist (Electric Light Orchestra)
 13 – Jarosław Kukulski (66), Polish composer
October
 5 – Jack Berntsen (69), Norwegian philologist, songwriter and folk singer
 10 – Solomon Burke (70), American R&B singer
 16 – Eyedea (28), American rapper (Eyedea & Abilities)
 20 – Ari Up (48), British post-punk singer (The Slits)
 25 – Gregory Isaacs (59), Jamaican reggae singer

November
 25 – Peter Christopherson (55), British industrial musician (Throbbing Gristle, Psychic TV, Coil)

December
 9 – James Moody (85), American jazz saxophonist
 17 – Captain Beefheart (69), American blues singer
 26 – Teena Marie (54), American R&B singer and bassist.
 28 – Billy Taylor (89), American jazz pianist

Songs released in 2010

See also 

 Timeline of musical events
 2010 in television

References

 
2010-related lists
Music-related lists
Music by year